HMS Felixstowe was a s built for the Royal Navy during the Second World War.

Design and description
The Bangor class was designed as a small minesweeper that could be easily built in large numbers by civilian shipyards; as steam turbines were difficult to manufacture, the ships were designed to accept a wide variety of engines. The ship's complement consisted of 60 officers and ratings.

She was powered by two vertical triple-expansion steam engines (VTE), each driving one shaft, using steam provided by two Admiralty three-drum boilers.

The VTE-powered Bangors were armed with a 12 pounder  anti-aircraft gun and a single QF 2-pounder (4 cm) AA gun or a quadruple mount for the Vickers .50 machine gun. In some ships the 2-pounder was replaced a single or twin 20 mm Oerlikon AA gun, while most ships were fitted with four additional single Oerlikon mounts over the course of the war. For escort work, their minesweeping gear could be exchanged for around 40 depth charges.

Construction and career
She was built by Lobnitz and Company, Renfrew, Scotland and launched on 22 July 1941.  She served in the Mediterranean during the Second World War. Thus far she has been the only ship of the Royal Navy named after the Suffolk town of Felixstowe. She struck a mine on 18 December 1943 and sank east of Capo Ferro, Sardinia, Italy.

References

Bibliography

External links
 HMS Felixstowe at Uboat.net

 

Bangor-class minesweepers of the Royal Navy
Ships built on the River Clyde
1941 ships
World War II minesweepers of the United Kingdom
Ships sunk by mines
Maritime incidents in December 1943
World War II shipwrecks in the Mediterranean Sea